Aliabad-e Seh Tolan (also Romanized as ‘Alīābād-e Seh Tolān) is a village in Darian Rural District, in the Central District of Shiraz County, Fars Province, Iran. At the 2006 census, its population was 207, in 54 families.

References 

Populated places in Shiraz County